Frederick Edward Johnson (March 10, 1894 - June 14, 1973) was a Major League Baseball player who played for the New York Giants and the St. Louis Browns. He debuted in 1922 on September 27 with the Giants. After the 1923 season he didn't appear again in the major leagues until 1938 when he pitched for the Browns. The fifteen year gap between pitching wins remains a major league record.   Johnson's final pitch was thrown the next year at the age of 45, making him one of the oldest pitchers to have ever appeared in a major league game. Throughout his career he walked more batters than he struck out.

Sources

1894 births
1973 deaths
Major League Baseball pitchers
New York Giants (NL) players
St. Louis Browns players
Baseball players from Texas
Nashville Vols players